Stoyko Lipchev (born 12 November 1945) is a Bulgarian fencer. He competed in the individual and team sabre events at the 1972 Summer Olympics.

References

1945 births
Living people
Bulgarian male sabre fencers
Olympic fencers of Bulgaria
Fencers at the 1972 Summer Olympics